Huron County is the name of several counties in North America:

 Huron County, Michigan 
 Huron County, Ohio
 Huron County, Ontario